Fehérvár Football Club (commonly known as Fehérvár, Vidi, or MOL Fehérvár Football Club for sponsorship reasons), is a Hungarian professional football club based in Székesfehérvár, which plays in the Nemzeti Bajnokság I, the top level of the Hungarian league system. Due to sponsorship reasons, the club changed its name from Videoton FC to MOL Vidi FC in 2018, the main sponsor of the club being oil and gas multinational company MOL. In 2019, the club changed its name once again to MOL Fehérvár FC.

Fehérvár has won the Nemzeti Bajnokság I three times, in 2011, 2015, and 2018. They have also won the Magyar Kupa twice: in 2006, after defeating Vasas on penalties in the final, and in 2019, after defeating Budapest Honvéd FC. They won the defunct Hungarian League Cup three times in 2008, 2009, and 2012 and the also defunct Hungarian Super Cup two times in 2011 and 2012. Fehérvár is best known in European football for reaching the 1985 UEFA Cup Final, being led by Ferenc Kovács. Most recently, the team has participated in the group stage of the UEFA Europa League in the 2012–13 and 2018–19 seasons.

The club colours are blue and red. Since 1967, Fehérvár has been playing its home matches the Sóstói Stadion, currently called MOL Aréna Sóstó due to sponsorship reasons. During the reconstruction of the stadium between 2016 and 2018, they played their home games in the Pancho Aréna in Felcsút.

Background

The original name of the football club, Videoton, comes from the Hungarian company (owned by the state between 1955 and 1991).

On 1 July 2018, the club's name was changed from Videoton FC to MOL Vidi FC despite strong disagreement of the supporters of the club. A further change was made on 1 July 2019, becoming Mol Fehérvár FC.  This change won't affect anything else, as the Vidi brand will also be used by the club.

History

Fehérvár was founded in 1941 as Székesfehérvári Vadásztölténygyár SK. After several name changes, adopting the term Videoton, the team played in the first division for the first time during the 1968 season but they were immediately relegated. Their first domestic success occurred in the 1975–76 season when they finished 2nd. Fehérvár's biggest domestic success happened in the 2010–11 season when they finished first. Later they repeated the success by winning the championship in 2015 and 2018.

At international level, Fehérvár's biggest success has been reaching the 1985 UEFA Cup Final where they lost to Real Madrid CF 1–3. That season, the team was able to knock out PSG in the second round and Manchester United in the quarterfinals.
Despite being Hungarian champions three times since 2000, Fehérvár have never qualified for the group stage of the UEFA Champions League. They did, however, reach the group stage of the Europa League in 2012–13 and 2018–19. With qualification for the later stages being a possibility until the last match day each time, Fehérvár ultimately failed to reach the top two spots of their groups both occasions.

Colours, badge and nicknames
The colours of the club are blue and red, representing the colours of the coat of arms of Székesfehérvár. The club used different crests and badges since their foundation in 1941. The crests also indicate the changes of the name of the club, however, the colours were always the same i.e. blue and red. The most famous nickname of the club is Vidi.

The badge (which is being used since 2009 with minor changes following the renamings) is blue and red, and in the centre the castle refers to the symbol of the town: "vár" from "Székesfehérvár" means castle. The name and the year of the foundation can also be seen on the badge.

Name changes
1941: Vadásztölténygyári SK
1942–44: Székesfehérvári MOVE Vadásztölténygyár Sport és Kultur Egyesület
1944–47: didn't participate in championships due to World War II
1947–48: Székesfehérvári Vadásztölténygyári SE
1948–50: Fehérvári Dolgozók SE
1950–56: Székesfehérvári Vadásztölténygyári Vasas SK
1957–62: Székesfehérvári Vasas SC
1962–68: Székesfehérvári VT Vasas
1968–90: Videoton Sport Club
1990–91: Videoton-Waltham SC
1991–93: Videoton-Waltham FC
1993–95: Parmalat FC
1995–96: Fehérvár-Parmalat FC
1996: Fehérvár Parmalat '96 FC
1996–04: Videoton FC Fehérvár
2004–09: FC Fehérvár
2009–2018: Videoton FC
2018–2019: MOL Vidi FC
2019–present: MOL Fehérvár FC

Manufacturers and shirt sponsors
The following table shows in detail Fehérvár FC kit manufacturers and shirt sponsors by year:

Stadium

The multi-purpose stadium of the club is located in Székesfehérvár, Hungary. The name of the stadium is Sóstói Stadion which originates from neighbouring Sóstó (in English Salt Lake). Its capacity is 14,300 (all seated) and it was opened in 1967. The record attendance was in 1985 when Videoton FC played Spanish giants Real Madrid in the first leg of the final of the 1984–85 UEFA Cup.

The first ground of the club could be found in the Berényi Street. On 26 September 1946, the first match was played at the Berényi Street Ground. Videoton played its matches here from 1950 to 1959. From 1959, the team played on a grass turf until 1967. The club moved to the Sóstói Stadion three times. The first era spent at the stadium was between 1948–50 and 1959–62. In 1967, the club moved there permanently.

In 2007, the academy of the team was founded in Felcsút, the village where Viktor Orbán, the Prime Minister spent his childhood. Videoton FC bought the team of Felcsút, which was played in the Nemzeti Bajnokság II and the team of the academy (named after Ferenc Puskás) competes in the Second League since that. The team is called Videoton-Puskás Ferenc Labdarúgó Akadémia (or Videoton II). Videoton-PFLA plays in Felcsút.

Due to the reconstruction of the Sóstói Stadion, Videoton played their home matches at the Pancho Aréna in the 2016–17 Nemzeti Bajnokság I and 2016–17 UEFA Europa League season. The Pancho Arena is located in Felcsút and its main tenant is Nemzeti Bajnokság II club Puskás Akadémia FC. The director of Videoton chose Pancho Aréna as their home due to the club's strong ties with Puskás Akadémia. However, the capacity of the Pancho Aréna is much smaller than Videoton's original stadium.

On 23 November 2016 the construction officially started.

On 7 February 2017, László Horváth, project manager of Sóstó Konzorcium, said that the first phase of the construction ended. The demolition of the interior of the remaining main stand ended. The concrete of the demolished parts of the main stand will be reused in the building of the new stands. The Sóstó Konzorcium will have 14 months to finish the construction of the stadium.

On 13 March 2017, László Horváth, project manager of Sóstó Konzorcium, said that thanks to the mild winter the construction of the new stadium is in good progress. The construction of the base of the stands were finished in March.

On 27 March 2017, it was confirmed that the construction of the stadium would be finished by 16 January 2018. Péter Gönczöl, managing director of Strabag-MML Kft., said that the construction is in the most spectacular phase when the biggest panels are positioned into their places. András Cser-Palkovics, mayor of Székesfehérvár, said that due to the severe weather conditions during winter the construction could be finished by the deadline. Róbert Varga, director of Strabag-Hungary, added that the new stadium will be able to host 14,201 spectators and the stadium will be lying on a base of 10,199 square metres and the highest point of the stadium will be 21.28 metres.

On 18 August 2017, it was announced that the main stand should also be demolished due to statical problems. Originally, the new stadium would have been built around the main stand. Due to the reconstruction of the main stand, the opening of the new stadium will be delayed to June 2018.

On 14 August 2018, an article was published on the Hungarian news website, Index.hu, stating that there will be further delays in the opening of the new stadium. One day later, it was announced that the 2018–19 UEFA Champions League play-off matches will be played at Ferencvárosi TC's home stadium, Groupama Aréna in Budapest.

The first match was played between Fehérvár FC and Újpest FC in the 2018–19 Nemzeti Bajnokság I season and it ended with a 1–0 victory for the home side. The first goal was scored by Roland Juhász. The new stadium was also renamed as MOL Aréna Sóstó for sponsorship reason. Since there was a MOL Aréna in Dunaszerdahely, Sóstó was added to the new name.

Ownership
Being the favourite football club of the Hungarian Prime Minister Viktor Orbán, from 2010, some of the most wealthy Hungarians started to appear in the VIP of the team (e.g. Sándor Csányi, president of the Hungarian OTP Bank and the Hungarian Football Association) by the side of the Prime Minister. The owner since December 2007 is István Garancsi, a friend of Viktor Orbán's.

Supporters and rivalries

The supporters of the club are based in Székesfehérvár, in Fejér County, Hungary. One of the group of supporters is the Red Blue Devils which is considered the main ultras of the team (there are smaller groups like Red-Blue City, Sóstói Hableányok, G-pont). Fehérvár FC is in rivalry with the most famous Hungarian clubs such as Ferencváros, Újpest, Győri ETO, Haladás, and Debrecen. The club has a local rival, Puskás Akadémia FC, based in Felcsút, Fejér County, but the rivalry is relatively tame. These two clubs had a stadium share in Felcsut while Fehérvár's stadium was under renovation, 2016–18. Fejer county's second most populated city is Dunaújváros, but Dunaferr FC, formerly based there, no longer exists. Between 1997 and 1999, Videoton's local rival was Gázszer FC which was based in Agárd, Fejér County.

Fehérvár FC has a selection of celebrity supporters such as the Prime Minister of Hungary, Viktor Orbán.

Honours

Domestic
Nemzeti Bajnokság I
 Winners (3): 2010–11, 2014–15, 2017–18
 Runners-up (8): 1975–76, 2009–10, 2011–12, 2012–13, 2015–16, 2016–17, 2018–19, 2019–20
Magyar Kupa
 Winners (2): 2005–06, 2018–19
 Runners-up (5): 1981–82, 2000–01, 2010–11, 2014–15, 2020–21
Ligakupa
 Winners (3): 2007–08, 2008–09, 2011–12
 Runners-up (2): 2012–13, 2013–14
Szuperkupa
 Winners (2): 2011, 2012
 Runners-up (3): 2006, 2010, 2015

International

UEFA Cup
 Runners-up (1): 1984–85
IFC
 Outright Group Winners (2): 1983, 1984

Players

Current squad
As of 31 January 2023

Players with multiple nationalities

   Lirim Kastrati
   Loïc Négo
   Marcel Heister
   Palkó Dárdai
   Stopira

Out on loan

Retired numbers

Club officials

Board of directors
As of 19 December 2022

Staff
As of 19 December 2022

Former club directors and sports directors

  György Mezey (07/01/2008-30/06/2011)
  Győző Burcsa (2014-17/08/2015)
  Zoltán Kovács (18 August 2015 – 17 July 2021)

Notable foreign players 

Angola

  Evandro Brandao

Bosnia and Herzegovina

  Mario Bozić
  Jusuf Dajić
  Elvir Hadžić 
  Anel Hadžić
  Armin Hodžić
  Kenan Kodro
  Asmir Suljić

Brazil

  André Alves
  Alison Silva
  Kaká
  Renato Neto
  César Romero
  Jeff Silva
  Edson
  Nildo Petrolina

Bulgaria

  Georgi Milanov

Cape Verde

  Stopira
  Zé Luís

Croatia

  Milan Pavličić
  Marko Pajač
  Dinko Trebotić

El Salvador
  Arturo Álvarez

France

  Loïc Nego
  Lyes Houri

Germany

  Marcel Heister

Guinea-Bissau

  Mamadu Candé

Guinea

  Alhassane Soumah

Morocco

  Sofian Chakla

North Macedonia

  Mirko Ivanovski
  Visar Musliu
  Boban Nikolov

Martinique

  Rémi Maréval

Montenegro

  Goran Vujovic
  Milan Purovic
  Mladen Bozovic
  Ilija Radović

Netherlands

  Kees Luijckx

Nigeria

  Ezekiel Henty
  Funsho Bamgboye

Portugal

  Marco Caneira
  Filipe Oliveira
  Vítor Gomes
  Jucie Lupeta

Romania

  Gabriel Vochin
  Daniel Tudor
  Marian Savu
  Adrian Rus

Russia

  Aleksandr Alumona

Serbia

  Aleksandar Stanojević
  Marko Andić
  Dušan Vasiljević
  Nikola Mitrović
  Milan Perić
  Uroš Nikolić
  Danko Lazović
  Marko Šćepović
  Stefan Šćepović
  Filip Pajović
  Branislav Danilović

Slovakia

  Tomáš Tujvel
  Pavol Durica
  Tomáš Medveď

Spain

  Álvaro Brachi
  Walter Fernández
  Juan Calatayud
  Héctor Sánchez

Sweden

  Bojan Djordjic

Ukraine

  Mykhaylo Denysov
  Bohdan Lyednyev
  Yevhen Makarenko
  Ivan Petryak
  Artem Shabanov

Uganda

  Martin Kayongo-Mutumba

See also
Fehérvár FC in European football
List of Fehérvár FC managers
List of Fehérvár FC seasons

References

External links

 Official website 

 
Football clubs in Hungary
Association football clubs established in 1941
1941 establishments in Hungary
Sport in Székesfehérvár
Works association football clubs in Hungary